John Tracy (October 26, 1783 in Norwich, Connecticut – June 18, 1864 in Oxford, New York) was an American lawyer and politician who served as Lieutenant Governor of New York from 1833 to 1838.

Life
At the beginning of the 19th century he moved to Columbus, New York. In 1805 he moved to Oxford, where he served as deputy county clerk under his relative Uri Tracy.  He studied law with Stephen O. Runyan, was admitted to the bar in 1808, and practiced in Oxford. He married Susan Hyde in Franklin, Connecticut, on August 30, 1813.

Tracy was active in politics, first as a Democratic-Republican, and later as a Democrat.  In 1815, he was appointed Surrogate of Chenango County, a post he held four years. He was elected to the New York State Assembly in 1820, and returned in 1821, 1822 and 1826.

In 1821 he was re-appointed surrogate, and in 1823 he became First Judge of the Court of Common Pleas, and he served until resigning in 1833.  In 1830 the state legislature elected Tracy as a regent of the University of the State of New York, and he served until 1833.

From 1833 to 1838, he was Lieutenant Governor under Governor William L. Marcy. In 1846 he was a delegate to the New York State Constitutional Convention, and was chosen its president. After this convention, Tracy withdrew from politics and government.

For many years Tracy was president of the Oxford Academy board of trustees.

He died in Oxford, New York on June 18, 1864, and was buried at the Riverview Cemetery in Oxford.

Tracy was survived by his daughters, Esther Marie Mygatt, widow of Henry R. Mygatt, and Susan Eliza Clarke, widow of James W. Clarke; and grandchildren, John Tracy Mygatt, Mai Mygatt, and William R. Mygatt, a lawyer in practice at Oxford, N.Y.

His great-great granddaughter Tracy Dickinson Mygatt was a Socialist playwright and pacifist.

Sources

External links
John Tracy Bio
Political Graveyard 
Members of Canal Commission, including Lt. Govs.

1783 births
1864 deaths
Lieutenant Governors of New York (state)
New York (state) lawyers
New York (state) Democratic-Republicans
Regents of the University of the State of New York
Democratic Party members of the New York State Assembly
Politicians from Norwich, Connecticut
New York (state) state court judges
Burials in New York (state)
People from Goshen, Connecticut
19th-century American politicians
19th-century American judges
19th-century American lawyers